Johnsonville is a city in Florence County, South Carolina, United States. The population was 1,480 at the 2010 census. It is part of the Florence Metropolitan Statistical Area.

The city was founded in 1913 west of the spot of the former Witherspoon's Ferry on the Pee Dee River, where General Francis Marion received his commission for the Revolutionary War.

History
In use during the American Revolution, Witherspoon's Ferry was the site where Francis Marion accepted command of the Williamsburg Militia in 1780. Ownership of the ferry lands passed from Robert to John Witherspoon in 1787. In 1802, John bequeathed the land to Aimwell Presbyterian Church.

Witherspoon's Ferry was a strategic ferry in the northeastern area of Williamsburg County, vested in John Witherspoon in 1801 and remaining in his charge until his death in 1815. According to the terms of John Witherspoon's will, the ferry was vested in J.D. Witherspoon, executor, for a term of 14 years, "in trust for and having the sole benefit of the incorporated Presbyterian Church at Aimwell on the Pee Dee River."

In 1819, former South Carolina Governor David R. Williams, son-in-law of John Witherspoon, obtained these ferry lands. William J. Johnson, born 1787, succeeded J.D. Witherspoon at the ferry after purchasing the plantation in 1825 from the Witherspoon estate. The 1850 census of Williamsburg County shows William Johnson, a man of considerable wealth for his time and place, living just below where the American Legion stands in Johnsonville today.

Johnson's Ferry was a stagecoach horse changeover and meal break station. As the stagecoach passed east over the Lynches River on the ferry, a Johnson slave in charge of the ferry mules announced the number of passengers with a blast from a fox horn: one blast for each passenger, thus informing Mrs. Johnson of the number of places that should be set for dinner.

The stagecoach stopped at the Johnsons' house. All the mail for the surrounding communities was left in Capt. Johnson's care. This provided an excellent reason for him to request a post office be granted. In 1843, a post office named Johnsonville was established near the ferry.

The city of Johnsonville was incorporated in 1913.

Geography
Johnsonville is located in southeastern Florence County at  (33.817802, -79.448288). The combined highways lead north  to U.S. Route 378 at Kingsburg and south  to Hemingway.

South Carolina Highway 341 passes through the center of town as Broadway Street, leading west  to Lake City.

The city of Johnsonville is located only a few miles from The Johnsonville Impact Crater, a circular geophysical feature that represents an ancient impact crater, situated at the junction of Lynches River and the Pee Dee River in South Carolina. Snows Island, at that point, is believed to be the upthrust of the center after the impact. This eight-mile-wide crater is not well defined at the surface and was discovered by magnetic anomalies and supported by the study of well drilling cores. Supposed impact breccia was found in these cores.

Demographics

As of the census of 2000, there were 1,418 people, 532 households, and 413 families residing in the city. The population density was 897.6 people per square mile (346.5/km2). There were 602 housing units at an average density of 381.1 per square mile (147.1/km2). The racial makeup of the city was 75.74% White, 22.78% Black, 0.21% Native American, 0.14% Asian, 0.56% from other races, and 0.56% from two or more races. Hispanic or Latino of any race were 1.06% of the population.

There were 532 households, out of which 35.7% had children under the age of 18 living with them, 52.8% were married couples living together, 18.6% had a female householder with no husband present, and 22.2% were non-families. 19.9% of all households were made up of individuals, and 9.2% had someone living alone who was 65 years of age or older. The average household size was 2.65 and the average family size was 3.03.

In the city, the population was spread out, with 26.4% under the age of 18, 8.9% from 18 to 24, 26.5% from 25 to 44, 25.8% from 45 to 64, and 12.3% who were 65 years of age or older. The median age was 37 years. For every 100 females, there were 88.1 males. For every 100 females age 18 and over, there were 82.7 males.

The median income for a household in the city was $34,274, and the median income for a family was $38,690. Males had a median income of $30,109 versus $19,500 for females. The per capita income for the city was $15,539. About 13.3% of families and 16.6% of the population were below the poverty line, including 21.5% of those under age 18 and 18.1% of those age 65 or over.

Education
Johnsonville's graded schools are located in Florence County School District 5, a small, rural district located in the lower part of Florence County encompassing the city of Johnsonville and the surrounding areas. The district covers approximately 88 square miles that includes a total population of 6,440 residents, which includes the 1,480 residents within the town limits.
 
Johnsonville has a public library, a branch of the Florence County Library System.

Arts and culture
The city hosts the annual Johnsonville Heritage Festival, which began in 2011 to celebrate the area's ties to the American Revolution.  Prior to the 2000s, a Founders Day festival was held on Broadway Street.  The 2022 Heritage Festival saw the event move from Odell Venters Landing back to Johnsonville's downtown Broadway Street location.

City Government
Johnsonville has a mayor and council government.  The City Council consists of a six-member elected body of five council members and the Mayor. All seats are on a four-year cycle and are at-large seats as the city is not divided into districts. City Council is responsible for forming policy and governing the city.  The City Administrator is appointed by City Council.  The administrator directs the daily operations of city government, supervises city employees and provides policy advice.
The current council makeup consists of:
 Johnny Hanna - Mayor (elected 2019)
 Jamie Altman - Mayor Pro Tempore (elected 2021)
 Gary Arthurs - Council (elected 2019)
 Frankie Poston - Council (elected 2019)
 M. Doolittle Stone - Council (elected 2021)
 Dipen Khambhaita - Council (elected 2021)

Joseph Stevens "Steve" Dukes, former mayor, is the city's longest serving public figure. He was first elected to council in 1981 and served continuously on council then as mayor until 2004.
Edward "Dwight" Carraway, Jr. (1956-2019), a resident of Johnsonville, was South Carolina's youngest person elected to public office in June 1976 (age 20).

Notable people
 Rosa Belle Eaddy Woodberry Dickson (1868-1953), educator and administrator, first woman elected mayor in the state of South Carolina (1925). 
 General John Henry Woodberry (1889-1974), Brigadier General; United States Army; Chief Ordnance Officer Southwest; Pacific Area SOS; World War II, 1944-1945
 Odell Venters (1917-2005), South Carolina House of Representatives, 1961–1968, 1971-1977
 Jim Maxwell, NFL linebacker

References

External links
  City of Johnsonville official website
  Johnsonville Heritage Festival
  Johnsonville History Website

Cities in South Carolina
Cities in Florence County, South Carolina
Florence, South Carolina metropolitan area